The Frontline States (FLS) were a loose coalition of African countries from the 1960s to the early 1990s committed to ending apartheid and white minority rule in South Africa and Rhodesia. The FLS included Angola, Botswana, Lesotho, Mozambique, Tanzania, Zambia, and Zimbabwe. The FLS disbanded after Nelson Mandela became President of South Africa in 1994.

In April 1975, the Frontline States – then consisting of Botswana, Lesotho, Tanzania and Zambia – were formally recognised as an entity as a committee of the Assembly of the Heads of State of the Organisation of African Unity. They were joined by Angola (1975), Mozambique (1975) and Zimbabwe (1980) when those countries gained their independence. Tanzanian President Julius Nyerere was the chairman until he retired in 1985. His successor was Zambian President Kenneth Kaunda. The countries met regularly to coordinate their policies.

Their mission was complicated by the fact that the economies of nearly all the FLS countries were dependent on South Africa, and many of their citizens worked there. Nevertheless, the FLS supported and sheltered groups opposed to white rule, not only in South Africa (the African National Congress), but also in Namibia (SWAPO), which was controlled by South Africa. These states provided asylum for exiled South African political activists and allowed the African National Congress (ANC) and the Pan Africanist Congress (PAC) to set up headquarters within their borders. The ANC was declared as the official representative of the South African People by the United Nations and the Organization of African Unity whilst its headquarters was officially in Lusaka. Thousands of South African youth traveled to these states to receive training in sabotage and guerrilla warfare. The Frontline States suffered greatly for their opposition and became the target of South Africa's policy of regional destabilization; South Africa launched military incursions in Botswana, Lesotho, Zambia, Zimbabwe and Mozambique and supported rebel groups seeking to topple the regimes in Angola (UNITA) and Mozambique (RENAMO).

American relations with the Frontline States reached their peak during the human rights push of the Carter administration. Under the Reagan administration's Assistant Secretary of State for African Affairs Chester Crocker, the Frontline States were engaged diplomatically to reach landmark peace accords between South Africa, Mozambique, Angola (Lusaka Protocol), and Namibia (New York Accords).

Other uses
The term "frontline states" is also used for countries bordering any area of crisis in the world.

See also
 Former Liberation Movements of Southern Africa

References

Organizations established in the 1960s
Organizations disestablished in the 1990s
International organizations based in Africa
Former international organizations
Southern Africa